And We Are Bled of Color was the first full-length album from the
band Stutterfly. This album features 13 tracks. The single from the album, "Gun in Hand", was featured on the House of Wax soundtrack, and the Warped Tour 2004 Compilation Album.

Track listing
"Dead Eyes" - 3:30
"Where Angels Fell" - 3:17
"Gun in Hand" - 3:29
"Fire Whispers" - 2:52
"Bury Me (The Scarlet Path)" - 3:04
"Silent Scream" - 3:20
"Burnt Memories" - 3:23
"The Breath" - 3:03
"Formula of Flesh" - 4:12
"The Sun Bleeds Red" - 2:53
"Shallow Reasons" - 3:02
"Life's Disease" - 3:24
"Flames Adorn the Silence" - 4:35

Personnel

Chris Stickney  - lead vocals
Bradyn Byron - rhythm guitar, vocals
Jordan Chase - bass guitar, vocals
Jason Ciolli - lead guitar
Ryan Loerke - drums, percussion

References

Stutterfly albums
2005 albums
Albums produced by Ulrich Wild